Herschel "Wimpy" Giddens (November 25, 1914 - February 12, 1959) was an American football tackle who played in the National Football League for the Philadelphia Eagles in 1938 and the Boston Yanks in 1944. He died on February 12, 1959, at his home in Wilmington, Delaware, after a short illness.

References

1914 births
1959 deaths
Philadelphia Eagles players
Boston Yanks players
Players of American football from Louisiana
Wilmington Clippers players